Codex Bobiensis or Bobbiensis (Siglum k, Nr. 1 by Beuron) is one of the oldest Old Latin manuscripts of the New Testament.  The fragmentary text contains parts of the Gospel of Mark (Mark 8:8-16:8) and Gospel of Matthew (Matthew 1:1-15:36).

Codex Bobiensis is the only known example of the shorter ending added directly to Mark 16:8, but not the "long ending" through Mark 16:20.

The Latin text of the codex is a representative of the Western text-type.

History 
It was probably written in North Africa, and is dated to the 4th or 5th century. Later, it was brought to the monastery in Bobbio in northern Italy. It was traditionally assigned to St. Columban, who died in the monastery he had founded there, in 615. Today it is housed in the Turin National University Library.

Researchers, comparing the Codex Bobiensis with quotes from Cyprian’s publications from the 3rd century, think it may represent a page from the Bible Cyprian used while he was a bishop in Carthage. A palaeographic study of the scripture determined it is a copy of a papyrus script from the 2nd century.

Matthew 8
In Matthew 8:12 it represents textual variant ἐξελεύσονται (will go out) instead of ἐκβληθήσονται (will be thrown). 

This variant is supported only by two Greek manuscripts Codex Sinaiticus, Codex Climaci Rescriptus, and by syrc, s, p, pal, arm, Diatessaron.

Mark 16
There is a unique reading following Mark 16:3:
Subito autem ad horam tertiam tenebrae diei factae sunt per totum orbem terrae, et descenderunt de caelis angeli et surgent in claritate vivi Dei (viri duo?); simul ascenderunt cum eo, et continuo lux facta est.

The text requires some guesswork. Bruce Metzger provides the following translation:
But suddenly at the third hour of the day there was darkness over the whole circle of the earth, and angels descended from the heavens, and as he [the Lord] was rising in the glory of the living God, at the same time they ascended with him; and immediately it was light.

The "Shorter Ending" runs as follows:
Omnia autem quaecumque praecepta erant et qui cum puero erant breviter exposuerunt. Posthaec et ipse ihesus adparuit, et ab orientem usque usque in orientem  misit per illos sanctam et incorruptam [praedicationis] salutis aeternae. Amen.

But they reported briefly to the boy and those with him all that they had been told. And after this, Jesus himself (appeared to them and) sent out by means of them, from east to east, the sacred and imperishable (proclamation) of eternal salvation. Amen.

See also
 List of New Testament Latin manuscripts

Notes

References

Further reading
 John Wordsworth, Old Latin Biblical Texts, Oxford 1886
 F. C. Burkitt, Notes. Saint Mark XV in codex k, JTS 1900, ss. 278-279.
 F. C. Burkitt, Further Notes on codex k, JTS 1904, ss. 100-107.
 C. H. Turner, A Re-collation of Codex k, JTS 1904, pp. 88–100.

External links and sources
 Bible Research: Codex Bobbiensis
 Catholic Planet: The Writing of the Gospels – Mark
 BIBLE VIEWS: Christian Doctrine and Practice: Translations and the Greek Text
 Image

Bobiensis
5th-century biblical manuscripts